Adriatic Airways is an airline based in Podgorica, Montenegro. It operates international charter flights from Podgorica and Tivat to neighbouring countries. Its main base is Podgorica Airport, with a hub at Tivat Airport.

History 
The airline was established in 1997 and started operations in 2000. Owner by Dragan Ivančević and has 4 employees (at April 2019).

Destinations 
Adriatic Airways operates scheduled flights from these cities/airport:

Domestic
 Montenegro
Podgorica (Podgorica Airport)
Tivat (Tivat Airport)

Fleet 
The Adriatic Airways fleet includes the following aircraft (at Jan 2020)
1 Cessna Citation 551SP    YU-BTT 
1 Cessna Citation 551SP    YU-TBB
1 Piper 28T                YU-DRR 
1 Cessna 172M              YU-DWW
1 Piper 28A              YU-CGS
1 R22                      YU-SCG

External links
Airways
Di Air on Airliners.net

References

Airlines of Montenegro
Airlines established in 1997
1997 establishments in Montenegro
Montenegrin brands
Companies based in Podgorica